School District 91 Nechako Lakes is a school district in British Columbia. It covers the area northwest of Prince George along Highway 16 This includes the major communities of Fort St. James, Vanderhoof, Burns Lake, and Fraser Lake.

History
School district 91 was formed in 1996 by the merging of School District No. 55 (Burns Lake) and School District No. 56 (Nechako).  School District 91 serves the communities of Fort St James, Vanderhoof, Fort Fraser, Fraser Lake, Burns Lake, Grassy Plains, Decker Lake, and Granisle.  In addition we are proud to work with 13 First Nation communities that have traditional lands within our geographic area.

Schools

 Fraser Lake Elementary-Secondary School is a unique 4-12 school. It has an enrollment of about 300 students, and services the communities of Fort Fraser, Nautley, Fraser Lake, Stellaten and Endako.

See also
List of school districts in British Columbia

Nechako Country
Omineca Country
91
School districts established in 1996
1996 establishments in British Columbia